The Party of Democratic Action of Sandžak (SDAS) is a political party in Serbia, representing the Bosniak ethnic minority concentrated in Sandžak region.

History 
The Party of Democratic Action of Sandžak (SDA) was founded on 29 July 1990 in Novi Pazar, as a branch of the Party of Democratic Action based in Sarajevo, which was then a pan-Yugoslav political party. The branch was founded in order to protect the interests of ethnic Muslims of Sandžak, Serbia, Montenegro and Kosovo. The leadership of the SDA included Sulejman Ugljanin, president of the SDA, Harun Hadžić, president of the SDA of Montenegro, Numan Balić, president of the SDA of Kosovo and Metohija and Riza Halili, president of the SDA of Preševo.

The SDA founded the Muslim National Council of Sandžak (MNVS) on 11 May 1991. The MNVS acted as a quasi-governmental body of the Sandžak Muslims. It organised a referendum between 25 and 27 October 1991, asking the Sandžak Muslims whether they're in favour of "full political and territorial autonomy" of Sandžak and its "right to join one of the sovereign republics", presumably the SR Bosnia and Herzegovina. The Serbian authorities declared the referendum unconstitutional. The referendum was organised with the support from the Bosnian SDA, although this was denied by the MNVS. The MNVS claimed that 264,000 people in Sandžak, the rest of the SFR Yugoslavia and abroad asked to be included on the voter list. The turnout was 71%, while 98% voted in favour of the political and territorial autonomy of Sandžak with right of joining to other republics of the SFR Yugoslavia. President of the SDA said that the MNVS will decide which republic will Sandžak join, depending on further developments. It historically advocated radical Bosniak nationalist and Islamist ideology.

In late November the MNVS selected a new government. The secretary of the SDA, Rasim Ljajić was named the prime minister, while Ugljanin remained the president of the MNVS. The SDA maintained majority in the government, with the Liberal Bosniak Organisation and the Party of National Equity also being represented.

After the European Community declared the recognition of former Yugoslav republics in December 1991, Ugljanin sent the results of referendum to the Dutch Foreign Minister Hans van den Broek asking for "the recognition and full international and legal subjectivity of Sandžak". In January 1992, the MNVS declared the creation of a "special status" for Sandžak that would give to the region a far-reaching autonomy. The initiative wasn't recognised by the Yugoslav or Serbian government.

In a follow-up letter to the European Ministerial Council of 5 April 1992, Ugljanin, under the impact of the imminent foundation of the Federal Republic of Yugoslavia (founded after other republics left the SFR Yugoslavia, except Serbia and Montenegro), and referring to the Bosnian War, asked again for the recognition of Sandžak, as well as deployment of UN troops and other international presence.

On 18 April, a Conference of Muslim Intellectuals of Sandžak, Montenegro and Serbia protested, in strong terms, against the foundation of the FR Yugoslavia against their will, calling for its nonrecognition. The MNVS adopted a resolution on 28 April that denied existence of the FR Yugoslavia, and insisted that the Sandžak Muslims should join the republic of their choice, which, in this case, was the Bosnian Muslim dominated Republic of Bosnia and Herzegovina. In the resolution, it was bluntly said that "Muslims of Sandžak do not recognise newly created Yugoslavia".

Electoral performance

Parliamentary elections

Local elections

Bosniak National Council 
The first elections for the national councils of various national minorities in Serbia were held in October 2014. The Bosniak National Council has 35 seats. The turnout for the Bosniak National Council was 35.7%. Most of the seats were won by the coalition led by the SDA of Sandžak, which gained 19 representatives, while the opposing coalition under Mufti Muamer Zukorlić won 16 seats.

See also 
Sandžak faction

References

Sources 
Books

 
 
 
 
 
 

Other

External links
Party of Democratic Action of Sandžak

1990 establishments in Serbia
Bosniak political parties in Serbia
Bosniak nationalism
Islamic political parties
Novi Pazar
Party of Democratic Action
Political parties established in 1990
Right-wing parties in Europe
Sunni Islamic political parties